Lobatse Senior Secondary School  is a government institution located in Lobatse, Botswana. It was established in the colonial era as a private school for whites but has been a public school since 1966 after independence. It received over 1000 students every year from different schools in the Southern District. It has boarding facilities which offer accommodation to students from far villages. Although it is known for doing well academically  and in sports, it is also known as a school with undisciplined students. It was the only school in Botswana with over 10 security guards and students were monitored by the police during lunch to make sure there was no trouble in the dining hall. The school has a foundation  named Lobatse Secondary school foundation that  supports it  by providing financial aid in the form of scholarships and grants in various areas including academic & non academic.

See also 

 Education in Botswana

References

External links 
 http://www.dailynews.gov.bw/news-details.php?nid=44835
https://www.thepatriot.co.bw/business/item/7390-lobsec-wins-bse-finance-competition-again.html
https://www.bamb.co.bw/bamb-honours-lobsec-prize-giving-ceremony

Schools in Botswana